This is a list of Judo organizations.
The International Budo Federation Judo Department Oceania

Worldwide governing bodies
International Judo Federation
Kodokan Judo Institute in Japan is the governing body of the art of judo.
 World Judo Federation
 International Budo Federation - Judo Department

Continental bodies
African Judo Union
Pan American Judo Confederation
Judo Union of Asia
European Judo Union
Oceania Judo Union

National bodies

Andorra
Judo Club Hantei

Austria
Österreichischer Judoverband

Australia
In Australia, the Judo Federation of Australia (JFA) is the largest judo association, and the only national body affiliated with the IJF. The Australian Kodokan Judo Association (AKJA) is affiliated with the WJF.
 Judo Federation of Australia - JFA
 Australian Kodokan Judo Association - AKJA
 Australian Judo Union  -  AJU
 International Budo Federation - Judo Department (IBFJD)

Canada
Judo Canada

Finland
Finnish Judo Federation

France
FFJDA is affiliated with the European Judo Union, and with the International Judo Federation.
Fédération Française de Judo, Jujitsu et Disciplines Associées - FFJDA (French Federation of Judo, Jujitsu and Related Disciplines) 
Collège Indépendant de Judo traditionnel et d’Arts Martiaux - CIJAM ( Independent College of traditional Judo and Martial Arts) 
École Française de Judo/Jujutsu Traditionnel - EFJJT (French School (in French Ecole) of Traditional Judo/Jujutsu )
Fédération Internationale Autonome de Junomichi - FIAJ ( Federation International Autonomous Junomichi )

Georgia
Georgian Judo Federation

Germany
German Judo Association, Deutscher Judobund (IJF)
German Dan Colleague, Deutsches Dan-Kollegium
Deutsche Judo Föderation (WJF)

Iceland
Iceland judo (WJF)

Ireland
Judo Ireland
Irish Judo Association
Northern Ireland Judo Federation

Italy
Federazione Italiana Judo Lotta Karate Arti Marziali (IJF)
Federazione Italiana Judo Tradizionale (WJF)

Japan
All Japan Judo Federation
Kodokan Judo Institute

Luxembourg
Judo Federation in Luxemburg

Netherlands
Judo Bond Nederland (JBN)

Norway
Norwegian Judo Federation

Philippines
Judo Filipinas

Scotland
JudoScotland - the national governing body for judo in Scotland.

Spain
Real Federación Española de Judo y Deportes Asociados - RFEJYDA (Royal Spanish Federation of Judo and Related Sports)
RFEJYDA is affiliated with the European Judo Union, and with the International Judo Federation.

Sweden
Swedish Judo Federation (IJF)
Traditional kodokan Judo Sweden (WJF)

United Kingdom
In the UK, the British Judo Association (BJA) is the largest judo association, and is part of the EJU and IJF. In Scotland, Wales and Northern Ireland, the BJA is represented by JudoScotland, the Welsh Judo Association and the Northern Ireland Judo Federation respectively. The British Judo Council (BJC) and the Amateur Judo Association (AJA) are both affiliated to the BJA. A number of smaller organisations exist, including the British Judo Council - Martial Arts Circle (BJC-MAC) and the Judo For All UK (JFA-UK) which is affiliated with the WJF.
All England Judo Federation - AEJF
Seishin Budo Founded by Alan Fromm (former BJC member) in 1984.
Bushido Za Zen - Formed by Arnold Davies in 1969 and merged with the Dutch Zazen organisation in 1971
Universal Budo Association - group formed by John Goldman in the early 1980s
There are also a number of organisations derived from George Mayo's Kyushindo organisation and Zen judo
Kyushindo International Association - KIA Formed by George Mayo in 1960 and named after Kenshiro Abbe's philosophy.
Mayoshindo - Split from KIA, initiated by Mayo in 2001.
Zen Judo Family - ZJF Dominic "Mac" McCarthy was a member of the Kyushindo International Association, but left to form his own organisation, the Zen Judo Family, in 1974
British Zen Judo Family Association - BZJFA split from the ZJF, run by Gordon Lawson
Shin Judo - small Zen Judo derived organisation
Kenshindo Ryu
Traditional Judo UK
International Gentle Art Society
There are other less classifiable organisations
International Budo Federation - IBF
Tokushima Budo Council International - TBCI
Bushi Karate Jitsu Association - BKJA
International Martial Arts Federation - IMAF
British Judo Society - BJS
Sho Shin Budo Kwai

United States
In the United States, the United States Judo, Inc. (USAJ), is the national governing body of judo pursuant to the Ted Stevens Olympic and Amateur Sports Act (36 U.S. Code § 220501 et seq).  A member organization of the U.S. Olympic Committee, USAJ is responsible for the development, support and selection of Olympic, Pan American and World Championship Teams, and is affiliated to the Pan American Judo Confederation and International Judo Federation. The two largest national grassroots judo organizations in the United States are the United States Judo Federation (USJF)  and the United States Judo Association (USJA), both of whom are the parent organizations of the USAJ. The USJA and USJF together form Grassroots Judo, whose aim is to grow judo, to train in the sport and recreational (technical) aspects of judo and enable people to contribute to society. Also there are the USA Traditional Kodokan Judo Association (USA-TKJA) and Amateur Athletic Union-Judo (AAU-Judo), which are affiliated with the Pan American Judo Union and World Judo Federation, the American Judo and Jujitsu Federation (AJJF) and the American Traditional Jujutsu Association (ATJA).

Vietnam
Vietnam Judo Association

See also

List of boxing organisations
List of kickboxing organizations

References

Judo
Judo-related lists
Judo organizations